This is an alphabetical list of French Ateliers producing Stained polychrome Glass.

List 

Lists of artists by medium